The 2008 New York Buzz season was the 14th season of the franchise in World TeamTennis (WTT).

Led by 2008 WTT Female Rookie of the Year Yaroslava Shvedova, the Buzz had 10 wins and 4 losses, winning the Eastern Conference championship. It went on to defeat the Kansas City Explorers, 21–18, in the WTT Final to win its first King Trophy as WTT champions.

Season recap

Drafts
For the third straight season, the Buzz passed on making a selection in the Marquee Player Draft. In the Roster Player Draft, the defending Eastern Conference champions left 2007 WTT Championship Most Valuable Player Rik de Voest unprotected in the first round and instead chose Yaroslava Shvedova. Nathan Healey was taken in the second round, leaving Ashley Fisher unprotected. The Buzz protected Gabriela Navrátilová in the third round, which gave the team two full-time female players and forced it to leave Gréta Arn unprotected. Vladimir Obradović was the Buzz's final selection in the draft. The team did not select any roster-exempt players. The Buzz named Jay Udwadia as its new head coach.

Move to Albany
On May 8, 2008, the Buzz announced that after 13 seasons at CDPHP Tennis Complex in Schenectady, New York, it would move its home matches to the larger Washington Avenue Armory Sports and Convention Arena in Albany. Buzz ownership said that it moved to the air-conditioned indoor arena which seats about 4,000 people for tennis, because it has secure parking to serve the team's growing fan base and to "give the team much more visibility and awareness and help increase the level of hospitality the Buzz wish to provide."

Briaud replaces Obradović
In June 2008, Vladimir Obradović suffered a knee injury that would cause him to miss the entire season. Just two days before the season opener, the Buzz signed Patrick Briaud to take Obradović's place on the roster.

Regular season
During the regular season, the Buzz did not have a winning streak of more than three matches but never lost consecutive matches. The team relied heavily on Yaroslava Shvedova and Nathan Healey, both of whom typically played three of the five sets in each match, while Gabriela Navrátilová and Patrick Briaud usually only played women's and men's doubles.

The Buzz started the season with two road victories before winning its home opener against the Boston Lobsters. On July 8, the Buzz visited the New York Sportimes and found themselves trailing, 15–10, after dropping the first three sets. Shvedova won the fourth set of women's singles, and Healey won the fifth set of men's singles to cut the Sportimes' lead to 21–20 and send the match to overtime. Jesse Witten took the first game of overtime from Healey to give the Sportimes the victory and hand the Buzz its first loss of the season, dropping its record to 3 wins and 1 loss.

The Buzz bounced back the next evening at home against the expansion Washington Kastles, but not without falling behind early again. The Kastles won the first two sets and then sent Serena Williams onto the court to face Shvedova in women's singles. Williams took the set in a tiebreaker to give the Kastles a 15–11 lead. Shvedova and Healey won a tiebreaker in mixed doubles to cut the lead to 19–16, and Healey's 5–2 set win over Justin Gimelstob in men's singles tied the score at 21 all and sent the match to a super tiebreaker, which Healey won, 7–4, to improve the Buzz's record to 4 wins and 1 loss.

Two nights later, the Buzz visited Washington for a rematch. The Buzz won three of the first four sets to build an 18–13 lead. But Robby Ginepri won the final set of men's singles, 5–3, over Healey and then won three straight games in overtime to send the match to a super tiebreaker. Ginepri completed the furious comeback by taking the super tiebreaker game, 7–4, to give the Kastles the win and drop the Buzz's record to 4 wins and 2 losses.

The Buzz went on the road on July 15, to face the 7–0 Kansas City Explorers, the only undefeated team remaining in WTT. With the match tied at 13 all after three sets, Navrátilová and Shvedova dominated Rennae Stubbs and Květa Peschke, 5–0, in women's doubles. Briaud and Healey closed out a 23–17 victory by taking a tiebreaker in the final set of men's doubles. The win improved the Buzz's record to 6 wins and 3 losses.

On July 18, the Buzz hosted the defending WTT Champion Sacramento Capitals in a rematch of the 2007 WTT Finals. Shvedova won the fourth set of women's singles, 5–2, and teamed with Navrátilová to win the opening set of women's doubles in a tiebreaker and with Healey to win the second set of mixed doubles, 5–3. Leading 18–14 after four sets, Briaud and Healey dropped the fifth set of men's doubles in a tiebreaker, but they won the second game of overtime to secure a 23–20 victory for the Buzz that improved its record to 7 wins and 3 losses.

Coming off a road loss to the Philadelphia Freedoms that included an appearance by coach Jay Udwadia playing the tiebreaker game of the men's singles set, the Buzz hosted the first-place Sportimes on July 20. The Sportimes could clinch the Eastern Conference championship with a win. Shvedova won the fourth set of women's singles, 5–1, and paired with Navrátilová for a 5–0 set win in women's doubles in the opening set and with Healey to take the second set of mixed doubles, 5–3. Briaud and Healey closed out a dominant 23–11 victory with a 5–2 set win in men's doubles. The win clinched the second consecutive playoff appearance for the Buzz and improved its record to 8 wins and 4 losses.

After the win over the Sportimes, the Buzz closed the regular season by winning all five sets in each of its final two matches to finish with 10 wins and 4 losses and a three-match winning streak.

Eastern Conference title
Under the 2008 playoff format, the WTT conference championships were decided in the regular season. After the Buzz completed its regular season on July 23, it trailed the New York Sportimes by one-half match in the Eastern Conference but held a standings tiebreaker edge based on games won in head-to-head matches, 43–33. Later that evening, the Sportimes lost on the road to the Sacramento Capitals, 20–19, when Eric Butorac and Sam Warburg took a fifth-set tiebreaker from Brian Wilson and Jesse Witten, giving the Buzz its second consecutive Eastern Conference championship.

Shvedova named Rookie of the Year
Yaroslava Shvedova was named WTT Female Rookie of the Year. She was second in the league in winning percentage in women's singles and fourth in women's doubles.

Battle for New York in WTT Semifinals
The Buzz was the overall number 2 seed which matched it with the number 3 seed, the New York Sportimes, in the WTT Semifinals on July 26, at Allstate Stadium at Westfield Galleria at Roseville in Roseville, California, the site of WTT's 2008 Championship Weekend. In the first ever postseason meeting between the two New York clubs, the Buzz dominated the match winning the first four sets. Nathan Healey and Yaroslava Shvedova opened the match with a 5–3 set win against John McEnroe and Hana Šromová in mixed doubles. Shvedova followed with a 5–2 women's singles win over Ashley Harkleroad. Healy took care of Jesse Witten, 5–2, in men's singles. Gabriela Navrátilová and Shvedova needed a tiebreaker to beat Harkleroad and Šromová, 5–4, and give the Buzz a 20–11 lead heading to the final set. McEnroe and Witten won a tiebreaker over Patrick Briaud and Healy in men's doubles to force overtime with the Buzz leading 24–16. Briaud and Healy won the second game of overtime to give the Buzz a 25–17 victory and send it to its fourth WTT Final.

WTT Final
On July 27, in the WTT Final, the Buzz faced the number 1 seed Kansas City Explorers, who were coming off a regular season record of 13 wins and 1 loss (coming at the hands of the Buzz on July 15) and thrashed the defending champion Sacramento Capitals 21–10 in the semifinals. Nathan Healey got the Buzz off to a good start with a win in the first set of men's singles over Dušan Vemić, 5–3. Yaroslava Shvedova followed with a 5–3 set win over Květa Peschke in women's singles to give the Buzz a 10–6 lead. The Explorers fought back with a 5–3 set win by Rennae Stubbs and Vemić in mixed doubles over Shvedova and Healey. Stubbs and Peschke then registered a 5–3 set win over Shvedova and Gabriela Navrátilová in women's doubles to tie the match at 16 all. In the final set, Healey and Patrick Briaud topped James Auckland and Vemić in men's doubles, 5–2, to secure the first King Trophy in Buzz history. Despite playing for the losing team, Stubbs was named WTT Championship Most Valuable Player.

Event chronology
 April 1, 2008: The Buzz protected Gabriela Navrátilová and selected Yaroslava Shvedova, Nathan Healey and Vladimir Obradović at the WTT Roster Player Draft. The Buzz left Rik de Voest, Ashley Fisher and Gréta Arn unprotected. Jay Udwadia was named the team's head coach.
 May 8, 2008: The Buzz announced that it would move its home matches to the Washington Avenue Armory Sports and Convention Arena in Albany, New York.
 July 1, 2008: The Buzz signed Patrick Briaud as a roster player.
 July 20, 2008: With a record of 8 wins and 4 losses, the Buzz clinched a berth in the WTT playoffs for the second consecutive season with a 23–11 home victory against the New York Sportimes.
 July 23, 2008: With a record of 10 wins and 4 losses, the Buzz clinched the Eastern Conference championship, when the Sacramento Capitals defeated the New York Sportimes, 20–19.
 July 26, 2008: The Buzz defeated the New York Sportimes, 25–17, in the WTT Semifinals to reach the WTT Final for the second consecutive season.
 July 27, 2008: The Buzz won the King Trophy as WTT champions, when it defeated the Kansas City Explorers, 21–18, in the WTT Final. It is the first WTT championship for the franchise.

Draft picks
Since the Buzz lost in the 2007 WTT Finals, it had the next-to-last (10th) selection in each round of WTT's two drafts. The Buzz passed on making any selections in the Marquee Player Draft. The league conducted its 2008 Roster Player Draft on April 1, in Miami, Florida. The selections made by the Buzz are shown in the table below.

The Buzz did not select any roster-exempt players.

Match log

Regular season
{| align="center" border="1" cellpadding="2" cellspacing="1" style="border:1px solid #aaa"
|-
! colspan="2" style="background:#006bb6; color:#fff200" | Legend
|-
! bgcolor="ccffcc" | Buzz Win
! bgcolor="ffbbbb" | Buzz Loss
|-
! colspan="2" | Home team in CAPS
|}

Playoffs
{| align="center" border="1" cellpadding="2" cellspacing="1" style="border:1px solid #aaa"
|-
! colspan="2" style="background:#006bb6; color:#fff200" | Legend
|-
! bgcolor="ccffcc" | Buzz Win
! bgcolor="ffbbbb" | Buzz Loss
|-
! colspan="2" | Home team in CAPS
|}
World TeamTennis Semifinals

World TeamTennis Final

Team personnel

Players and coaches
 Jay Udwadia, Player-Coach
 Patrick Briaud
 Nathan Healey
 Gabriela Navrátilová
 Vladimir Obradović
 Yaroslava Shvedova

Front office
 Nitty Singh, Owner, President and General Manager

Notes:

Statistics
Players are listed in order of their game-winning percentage provided they played in at least 40% of the Buzz's games in that event, which is the WTT minimum for qualification for league leaders in individual statistical categories.
Men's singles - regular season

Women's singles - regular season

Men's doubles - regular season

Women's doubles - regular season

Mixed doubles - regular season

Team totals - regular season

Men's singles - playoffs

Women's singles - playoffs

Men's doubles - playoffs

Women's doubles - playoffs

Mixed doubles - playoffs

Team totals - playoffs

Men's singles - all matches

Women's singles - all matches

Men's doubles - all matches

Women's doubles - all matches

Mixed doubles - all matches

Team totals - all matches

Transactions
 April 1, 2008: The Buzz protected Gabriela Navrátilová and selected Yaroslava Shvedova, Nathan Healey and Vladimir Obradović at the WTT Roster Player Draft. The Buzz left Rik de Voest, Ashley Fisher and Gréta Arn unprotected. Jay Udwadia was named the team's head coach.
 July 1, 2008: The Buzz signed Patrick Briaud as a roster player.

Individual honors and achievements
Yaroslava Shvedova was named WTT Female Rookie of the Year. She was second in the league in winning percentage in women's singles and fourth in women's doubles.

See also

 Sports in New York's Capital District
 Athletics in upstate New York
 Sports in New York

References

External links
World TeamTennis official website

San Diego Aviators seasons
New York Buzz season
New York Buzz 2008
New York Buzz 2008
New York Buzz